Sri Lankan Malays ( Shri Lanka Mæle Janathava (Standard);  Mæle Minissu / Ja Minissu (Colloquially);  are Sri Lankan citizens with full or partial ancestry from the Indonesian Archipelago, Malaysia, or Singapore. In addition, people from Brunei and the Philippines also consider themselves Malays. The term is a misnomer as it is used as a historical catch-all term for all native ethnic groups of the Malay Archipelago who reside in Sri Lanka; the term does not apply solely to the ethnic Malays. They number approximately 40,000 and make up 0.2% of the Sri Lankan population, making them the fourth largest of the five main ethnic groups in the country.

Sri Lankan Malays first settled in the country in 200 B.C., when the Austronesian expansion reached the island of Sri Lanka from Maritime Southeast Asia (which includes peoples as diverse as Sumatrans to Lucoes) and brought speakers of the Malayo-Polynesian language group to Sri Lankan shores. This migration accelerated when both Sri Lanka and Indonesia were Dutch colonies (1640–1796), while a second wave (1796–1948) came from the Malay Peninsula, when both Malaya and Sri Lanka were in the British Empire. However, Sri Lanka has had a history of Malay presence dating back to as early as the 13th century. Distinct to the present-day Sri Lankan Malay population, these Malay migrants were primarily Buddhists who intermarried into the Sinhalese population. Sri Lankan scholars suggest that the Sinhalese population possesses a notable Malay connection due to this, meaning a significant portion of the Sri Lankan population would have at least some Malay ancestry.

History
A significant Malay presence in Sri Lanka dates as far back as the 13th century, when Chandrabhanu Sridhamaraja, a Malay of Tambralinga, managed to occupy the northern part of the island in 1247; his followers assimilated into the local population. Many ancestors of present-day Sri Lankan Malays were soldiers posted by the Dutch, and later by the British, for the colonial administration of Sri Lanka, who decided to settle on the island. Other immigrants were convicts or members of noble houses from the Dutch East Indies (present-day Indonesia), who were exiled to Sri Lanka and who never left. The main source of a continuing Malay identity is their common Malay language, the Islamic faith, and their ancestral origin from the Malay Archipelago. Many Sri Lankan Malays have been celebrated as courageous soldiers, politicians, sportsmen, lawyers, accountants, and doctors.

Society

Language

Depending on where they live in the country and other socio-economic factors, Sri Lankan Malays speak Sinhala, Tamil, and/or English. According to the 2012 census, 79.2%, or 28,975 Sri Lankan Malays also spoke Tamil and 66.2%, or 24,202 also spoke English.

Religion
Like their ancestors in present-day Indonesia and Malaysia, Sri Lankan Malays are Muslim.  Mosques were erected by the local Malays along the coasts of Sri Lanka in places like Hambantota, Beruwela, and Galle. The Jawatte mosque in Colombo and Masjidul Jamiya, the military mosque on Slave Island, are renowned for their architecture and long history. The first two storeys of the Grand Mosque in Sri Lanka was built by Mohammed Balankaya, an exiled Malay noble of the royal house of Gowa (in present-day Sulawesi, Indonesia). Today, the mosque is of great significance and is a symbol of Muslims in Sri Lanka; it is the Grand Mosque of Sri Lanka, where decisions affecting the lives of the island's Muslim population are made.

Sri Lankan Malay names
First and last names among Sri Lankan Malays are mostly of Sanskrit origin and are similar (including equivalents) to names used by Sinhalese people. Common last names include Jayah, Weerabangsa, Sinhawangsa/Sinhawansa, Jayawangsa, Singalaxana, Bangsa Jayah, and Wangsa. Malay-origin last names include Lye, Samath, Cuttilan, Chunchie, Preena, Hannan, Sallay, Doole, Kitchilan, Kutinun, Kanchil, Sainon, Bongso, Bohoran, Kuppen, and Lappen. Arabic names are also used by Sri Lankan Malays, including Saldin, Assan, Rahman, Drahaman, Bucker, Ramlan, Rajap, Jumat, and Mannan. Prefixes of Malay origin such as Tuan, Maas, and Raden for males and Gnei, Nona, Sitti Nona, and Gnonya for females are commonly used as first names among Sri Lankan Malays.

Legacy

Organisations
 All Ceylon Malay Political Union
 Colombo Malay Cricket Club
 Sri Lanka Malay Association
 Malay Association Kolonnawa Electorate (MAKE)
 Conference of Sri Lanka Malays
 Dunia Melayu Dunia Islam
 Kurunegala Malay Association

Malay place names in Sri Lanka
Some place names in Sri Lanka have references indicating the presence of Javanese and Malay communities or their contribution to the location. Some of these are:
 Jaffna (Java Pattanam)
 Ja Goda 
 Ja Kotuwa 
 Thavasikulam
 Hambanthota (Sampan- Thota)
 Taiyiddi 
 Thachathopu 
 Jawatte 
 Kartel (Slave Island)
 Ja-Ela  
 Javakachcheri (Chavakachcheri)
 street names such as Malay Street, Java Lane, Jalan Padang

Notable Sri Lankan Malays

See also
 Islam in Sri Lanka
 Sri Lankan Malay language
 List of Sri Lankan Malays
 Malayisation
 Malay invasions of Sri Lanka

Notes

References

 
Kingdom of Kandy
Malay people
Ethnic groups in Sri Lanka